Celeste Katz Marston is a correspondent for WBAI FM New York radio.

Biography

Celeste Katz Marston is a freelance reporter and investigator. She is the co-host of WBAI New York's "Driving Forces."   Her freelance writing most recently appears in Nieman Reports, NBC Asian America, and Cosmopolitan. She is also the co-author of Is This Any Way to Vote? Vulnerable Voting Machines and the Mysterious Industry Behind Them (WhoWhatWhy, 2020). 

Katz Marston graduated Brown University with a BA in International Relations, was an executive editor and later an alumni trustee of the Brown Daily Herald, and frequently gave pool clinics at the GCB. She started her professional reporting career at the Providence Journal in 1995. During her five-year tenure, she wrote government, law enforcement and human interest stories, as well as a pop culture column.

Katz Marston was a political correspondent, columnist and blogger for the New York Daily News from 2000 to 2015. Her assignments included stints at City Hall and the State Capitol, and her reporting spanned four presidential, gubernatorial and mayoral elections. 

She was senior political correspondent for Mic in 2016 and 2017. There, she covered the 2016 presidential election and co-hosted "Special Relationship," an international podcast jointly presented with The Economist and recognized for outstanding political journalism by Poynter Institute readers. 

Katz Marston was subsequently a senior politics writer for Newsweek. 

She was senior political reporter for Glamour, covering the midterm elections, in 2018.  

Katz Marston has been a commentator on U.S. politics and news for the Australian Broadcasting Corporation radio since 2007, and she has appeared as a host and co-host on Sirius XM radio, filling in on three-hour live talk programs including "The David Webb Show" and "Patriot Tonight." Her reporting has also appeared in The Boston Globe, Elle, Town & Country, The Forward, and The Daily Dot, among other outlets.

References

Sources
Katz's Mic author profile.
The Daily Politics site
 
 

Year of birth missing (living people)
Living people
American women writers
American bloggers
New York Daily News people
Place of birth missing (living people)
Brown University alumni
American women bloggers
Newsweek people
American women journalists
American radio personalities
Sirius XM
21st-century American non-fiction writers
21st-century American women writers